Forasartan, otherwise known as the compound SC-52458, is a nonpeptide angiotensin II receptor antagonist (ARB, AT1 receptor blocker).

Indications 
Forasartan is indicated for the treatment of hypertension and, similar to other ARBs, it protects the kidneys from kidney blood vessel damage caused by increased kidney blood pressure by blocking renin–angiotensin system activation.

Administration 
Forasartan is administered in the active oral form   which means that it must go through first pass metabolism in the liver. The dose administered ranges between 150 mg-200 mg daily. Increasing to more than 200 mg daily does not offer significantly greater AT1 receptor inhibition. Forasartan is absorbed quickly in the GI, and within an hour it becomes significantly biologically active. Peak plasma concentrations of the drug are reached within one hour.

Contraindications 
Negative side effects of Forasartan are similar to other ARBs, and include hypotension and hyperkalemia. There are no drug interactions identified with forasartan.

Pharmacology

The angiotensin II receptor, type 1 
Angiotensin II binds to AT1 receptors, increases contraction of vascular smooth muscle, and stimulates aldosterone resulting in sodium reabsorption and increase in blood volume. Smooth muscle contraction occurs due to increased calcium influx through the L-type calcium channels in smooth muscle cells during the plateau component, increasing the intracellular calcium and membrane potential which sustain depolarization and contraction.

Effects 
Forasartan is a competitive and reversible ARB that competes with the angiotensin II binding site on AT1 and relaxes vascular smooth muscle, resulting in decreased blood pressure. Forasartan has a high affinity for the AT1 receptor (IC50=2.9 +/- 0.1nM). In dogs, it was found to block the pressor response of Angiotensin II with maximal inhibition, 91%. Forasartan administration selectively inhibits L-type calcium channels in the plateau component of the smooth muscle cells, favoring relaxation of the smooth muscle. Forasartan also decreases heart rate by inhibiting the positive chronotropic effect of high frequency preganglionic stimuli.

Scarce use  
Even though experiments have been conducted on rabbits, guinea pigs, dogs  and humans, forasartan is not a popular drug of choice for hypertension due to its short duration of action; forasartan is less effective than losartan. Research demonstrates that forasartan is also significantly less potent than losartan.

See also 
Discovery and development of angiotensin receptor blockers

References 

Angiotensin II receptor antagonists
Tetrazoles
Triazoles
Pyridines